Maria Eleanor Vere Cust  (1862 or 1863 – 1958) was an English geographer and missionary who was the first woman to become a Fellow of the Royal Geographical Society.

Cust's father was Robert Needham Cust (1821-1909), an orientalist, colonial administrator, and judge in India. Her mother was Maria Adelaide  Hobart (died 1864), daughter of Henry Lewis Hobart, Dean of Windsor. Her elder sister was nurse and writer Albinia Lucy Wherry (1857-1929).

Cust "acted for many years as her father's secretary, materially aiding his studies", and  also worked as a medical missionary in India. She is said to have produced "passable" translations of writers including Heinrich Heine, Joseph Freiherr von Eichendorff, and Victor Hugo.

The Royal Geographical Society did not admit women to its membership on equal terms with men until 1913, and in 1847 had agreed that it was "not deemed expedient at present" to admit women as members. Cust's father Robert proposed a motion in 1892 which led to the election of fifteen "well qualified ladies" to fellowship on 28 November 1892. They were elected in alphabetical order, and because  Isabella Bird Bishop was at the time in Tibet, Maria Cust, as the next in sequence, was the first woman to be elected as a fellow.

Selected publications
The family-bookcase of Belton House, Lincolnshire / Compiled by Robert Needham Cust, ... with the assistance of his daughter, Maria Eleanor Vere Cust (1903) 
Songs of sunshine and shadow (1903, privately printed)
The annunciation and other poems (1904, privately printed)
Lucem Sequor and other poems (1909, Kegan Paul, Trench, TrUbner & Co.)

References

 

1860s  births
1958 deaths
Fellows of the Royal Geographical Society
Women geographers
19th-century geographers
English geographers
Date of birth missing
Date of death missing
Place of death missing
Place of birth missing